Denise Yvonne Dowse (February 21, 1958 – August 13, 2022) was an American actress and director. She was best known for her roles as Mrs. Yvonne Teasley in the television series Beverly Hills, 90210 (1991–2000), Judge Rebecca Damsen in The Guardian (2001–2004), and Dr. Rhonda Pine in Insecure.

Her film roles included Olivia Biggs in Bio-Dome (1996), Sky Marshal Meru in Starship Troopers (1997), Judge Constance Mullen in A Civil Action (1998), Marlene Andre in Ray, Principal Garrison in Coach Carter (2005), and Flora in The Call (2013).

Early life
Denise Yvonne Dowse was born on February 21, 1958, in Honolulu, Hawaii, the daughter of a naval officer. She graduated with a Bachelor of Arts degree from Norfolk State University.

Career

Dowse started acting in 1989, playing Angela Quartermane in an episode of the television series Almost There.

From 1989, she appeared in numerous TV series, such as ALF, Full House, Murphy Brown, Seinfeld, Buffy the Vampire Slayer, ER, Charmed, Shark, The Mentalist, Monk, and House. 

Dowse appeared in the 2005 comedy film Guess Who, featuring Bernie Mac and Ashton Kutcher.

Dowse became best known for her role of Yvonne Teasley on Beverly Hills, 90210,  after appearing as Judge Rebecca Damsen on The Guardian from 2001 through 2004. From 1993 to 1994, she appeared as a recurring character known as Vice Principal McBride in the television series California Dreams.

From 2000 to 2004, she provided the voice of Officer Shirley in the Nickelodeon animated series Rocket Power for the last three seasons of the show's run, replacing CCH Pounder, who voiced the character in the first season.

In 2020, she appeared as Valeria in the thriller film Fatale, featuring Hilary Swank, Michael Ealy, and Mike Colter.

Dowse directed the drama film Remember Me: The Mahalia Jackson Story, featuring Ledisi, Corbin Bleu, Keith David, Vanessa Williams, and Columbus Short. The film premiered in April 2022 at the 30th Pan African Film and Arts Festival in Los Angeles.

Death 
Dowse fell into a coma in August 2022, in connection with meningitis. She died on August 13, 2022, at the age of 64.

Personal Life 
According to Dowse, she was a self-described lifelong Democrat and was an adherent to the Methodist faith. She never married nor had any children due to the fact that she never had a desire to have those things in her life.

Filmography

Film

Television

Video games

References

External links
 

1958 births
2022 deaths
American film actresses
American television actresses
American voice actresses
African-American actresses
20th-century American actresses
21st-century American actresses
Norfolk State University alumni
Actresses from Honolulu
20th-century African-American women
20th-century African-American people
21st-century African-American women
21st-century African-American people
Deaths from meningitis
California Democrats
Hawaii Democrats
American Methodists